Trey Storm Nielsen (born September 1, 1991) is an American former professional baseball pitcher. He played four seasons in the St. Louis Cardinals organization.

Nielsen attended Skyline High School in Millcreek, Utah. He was drafted by the Chicago Cubs in the 42nd round of the 2010 Major League Baseball Draft, but did not sign and attended the University of Utah. He was drafted by the St. Louis Cardinals in the 30th round of the 2013 MLB Draft.

Nielsen was on Italy's roster for the 2017 World Baseball Classic.

References

External links

1991 births
Living people
Baseball players from Salt Lake City
Baseball pitchers
Utah Utes baseball players
State College Spikes players
Palm Beach Cardinals players
Springfield Cardinals players
Memphis Redbirds players
2017 World Baseball Classic players